Manju Asrani (née Bansal) is a Hindi Film actress of the 1970s and 80s. She is married to the actor Govardhan Asrani, popularly known simply as Asrani. While working on the sets of Aaj Ki Taaza Khabar and Namak Haraam, the couple fell in love.

Filmography

Actor

Director

References

Indian film actresses
Living people
Year of birth missing (living people)